Eric Houle (November 2, 1981 – March 26, 2011) was a placekicker who played in the Arena Football League (AFL) for the Arizona Rattlers.

High school years

Houle attended Kearsley High School in Flint, Michigan, and was a student and a letterman in football and soccer. In football, he was a first team All-Big Nine Conference selection as a senior. In soccer, he was a three-time All-District selection.

College career
Houle attended Saginaw Valley State University and was a kicker.

Professional career
Eric Houle played for four arena football teams: the Las Vegas Gladiators (2006), New Orleans VooDoo (2007), Grand Rapids Rampage (2008), and the Arizona Rattlers (2008).

References

External links
AFL stats from arenafan.com

1981 births
2011 deaths
American football placekickers
Arizona Rattlers players
Grand Rapids Rampage players
Las Vegas Gladiators players
New Orleans VooDoo players
Saginaw Valley State Cardinals football players
Players of American football from Flint, Michigan